Two Among Millions (German: Zwei unter Millionen) is a 1961 West German drama film directed by Victor Vicas and starring Hardy Krüger, Loni von Friedl and Joseph Offenbach.

The film's sets were designed by the art directors Hans Auffenberg and Albrecht Hennings.

Cast
 Hardy Krüger as Karl 
 Loni von Friedl as Christine
 Walter Giller as Paulchen
 Joseph Offenbach as Lohmann 
 Ilse Fürstenberg as Frau Lohmann 
 Fritz Tillmann as Petersen 
 Ludwig Linkmann as Bienert 
 Harry Gillmann as Wilhelm 
 Reinhold Bernt as Schliemke 
 Lore Hartling as Helga 
 Maly Delschaft
 Claus Tinney
 Traute Bengen
 Henriette Gonnermann
 Oscar Sabo
 Manfred Meurer
 Siegfried Dornbusch
 Heinz G. Diesing
 Tobias Pegel
 Hellmut Grube
 Fred Woywode

References

Bibliography
 Bock, Hans-Michael & Bergfelder, Tim. The Concise Cinegraph: Encyclopaedia of German Cinema. Berghahn Books, 2009.

External links 
 

1961 films
1961 drama films
German drama films
West German films
1960s German-language films
Films directed by Victor Vicas
Films set in Berlin
UFA GmbH films
1960s German films